The Harrison Micropolitan Statistical Area, as defined by the United States Census Bureau, is an area consisting of two counties in the U.S. state of Arkansas, anchored by the city of Harrison.

As of the 2010 census, the MSA had a population of 45,223.

Counties
Boone
Newton

Communities

Places with more than 12,000 inhabitants
Harrison (Principal city)

Places with 425 to 800 inhabitants
Diamond City
Bergman
Bellefonte
Jasper

Places with 175 to 400 inhabitants
Alpena (partial)
Western Grove
Lead Hill
Omaha

Places with less than 175 inhabitants
Valley Springs
Everton
Zinc
South Lead Hill

Unincorporated places
Marble Falls
Olvey

Demographics
As of the census of 2000, there were 42,556 people, 17,351 households, and 12,356 families residing within the MSA. The racial makeup of the MSA was 97.56% White, 0.12% African American, 0.68% Native American, 0.29% Asian, 0.02% Pacific Islander, 0.35% from other races, and 0.99% from two or more races. Hispanic or Latino of any race were 1.06% of the population.

The median income for a household in the MSA was $27,372, and the median income for a family was $32,554. Males had a median income of $24,760 versus $18,442 for females. The per capita income for the MSA was $14,982.

See also
Arkansas census statistical areas

References